Foreign Objects was a Canadian television series, which aired on CBC Television in 2001. A short-run dramatic anthology series, the series was written and produced by Ken Finkleman.

Finkleman starred as documentary producer George Findlay, the same character he had played in his earlier series The Newsroom, More Tears and Foolish Heart. Apart from Findlay, each episode focused on a different set of characters and told a self-contained story based on themes of human frailty and obsession. The show's other main recurring character was Tibor (Colm Feore), a European acquaintance of Findlay's who was involved in drawing Findlay to the various settings in which the show's events took place. The cast also included Karen Hines, Tom McCamus, Arsinée Khanjian, Larissa Laskin, Kim Huffman and Rebecca Jenkins.

Episodes included "Evil", in which Findlay went to Kosovo to make a documentary on the Kosovo War but strove to sensationalize it for ratings, and "Celebrity", in which a group of public relations consultants were tasked with publicizing the Second Coming of Jesus Christ.

The series received a Gemini Award nomination for Best Dramatic Series at the 17th Gemini Awards in 2002.

Finkleman's next project for the CBC was the television movie Escape from the Newsroom.

Episodes

References

External links

2000s Canadian anthology television series
CBC Television original programming
2001 Canadian television series debuts
2001 Canadian television series endings
2000s Canadian drama television series
Television series created by Ken Finkleman